Glenea elegans is a species of beetle in the family Cerambycidae. It was described by Olivier in 1795, originally under the genus Saperda. It is known from Malaysia, Thailand, Sumatra, and Java.

Varietas
 Glenea elegans var. affinis Ritsema, 1892
 Glenea elegans var. clytia Thomson, 1879
 Glenea elegans var. delia Thomson, 1860

References

elegans
Beetles described in 1795